Timothy Lomai is a former professional rugby league footballer who played for the PNG Hunters in the Queensland Cup and has represented Papua New Guinea Kumuls during the Pacific Rugby League International Test. He played for east tigers in Queensland cup. He’s also a PNG kickboxing champion and
Had few professional fight representing Papua New Guinea locally and abroad.  He's now currently signed with Hay Magpies RFL in NSW group 20 league. He had coached  Magpies for a season and also and currently residing in Hay shire.

References

Papua New Guinea Hunters players
Living people
Papua New Guinean rugby league players
Papua New Guinea national rugby league team players
Year of birth missing (living people)